Artificial lighting technology began to be developed tens of thousands of years ago and continues to be refined in the present day.

Antiquity 
 125,000 BC Widespread control of fire by early humans.
 17,500 BC oldest documented lamp, utilizing animal fat as fuel
 c. 4500 BC oil lamps
 c. 3000 BC candles are invented.

18th century 
 1780 Aimé Argand invents the central draught fixed oil lamp.
 1784 Argand adds glass chimney to central draught lamp.
 1792 William Murdoch begins experimenting with gas lighting and probably produced the first gas light in this year.
 1800 French watchmaker Bernard Guillaume Carcel overcomes the disadvantages of the Argand-type lamps with his clockwork fed Carcel lamp.

19th century 
 1800–1809 Humphry Davy invents the arc lamp when using Voltaic piles (battery) for his electrolysis experiments.
 1802 William Murdoch illuminates the exterior of the Soho Foundry with gas.
 1805 Philips and Lee's Cotton Mill, Manchester was the first industrial factory to be fully lit by gas.
 1809 Humphry Davy publicly demonstrates first electric lamp over 10,000 lumens, at the Royal Society.
 1813 National Heat and Light Company formed by Fredrich Winzer (Winsor)
 1815 Humphry Davy invents the miner's safety lamp.
 1823 Johann Wolfgang Döbereiner invents the Döbereiner's lamp.
 1835 James Bowman Lindsay demonstrates a light bulb based electric lighting system to the citizens of Dundee.
 1841 Arc-lighting is used as experimental public lighting in Paris.
 1853 Ignacy Lukasiewicz invents the modern kerosene lamp.
 1856 glassblower Heinrich Geissler confines the electric arc in a Geissler tube.
 1867 A. E. Becquerel demonstrates the first fluorescent lamp.
 1874 Alexander Lodygin patents an incandescent light bulb.
 1875 Henry Woodward patents an electric light bulb.
 1876 Pavel Yablochkov invents the Yablochkov candle, the first practical carbon arc lamp, for public street lighting in Paris.
 1879 (About Christmas time) Col. R. E. Crompton illuminated his home in Porchester Gardens, using a primary battery of Grove Cells, then a generator which was better. He gave special parties and illuminated his drawing room and dining room. Source: Practical Electrical Engineering, Newnes. Article entitled "The Development of Electric Lighting". 
 1879 Thomas Edison and Joseph Wilson Swan patent the carbon-thread incandescent lamp. It lasted 40 hours.
 1880 Edison produced a 16-watt lightbulb that lasts 1500 hours.
 1882 Introduction of large scale direct current based indoor incandescent lighting and lighting utility with Edison's first Pearl Street Station
 c. 1885 Incandescent gas mantle invented, revolutionises gas lighting.
 1886 Great Barrington, Massachusetts demonstration project, a much more versatile (long-distance transmission) transformer based alternating current based indoor incandescent lighting system introduced by William Stanley, Jr. working for George Westinghouse.  Stanley lit 23 businesses along a 4000 feet length of main street stepping a 500 AC volt current at the street down to 100 volts to power incandescent lamps at each location.
 1893 GE introduces first commercial fully enclosed carbon arc lamp. Sealed in glass globes, it lasts 100h and therefore 10 times longer than hitherto carbon arc lamps 
 1893 Nikola Tesla puts forward his ideas on high frequency and wireless electric lighting which included public demonstrations where he lit a Geissler tube wirelessly.
 1894 D. McFarlan Moore creates the Moore tube, precursor of electric gas-discharge lamps.
 1897 Walther Nernst invents and patents his incandescent lamp, based on solid state electrolytes.

20th century 
 1901 Peter Cooper Hewitt creates the first commercial mercury-vapor lamp.
 1904 Alexander Just and Franjo Hanaman invent the tungsten filament for incandescent lightbulbs.
 1910 Georges Claude demonstrates neon lighting at the Paris Motor Show.
 1912 Charles P. Steinmetz invents the metal-halide lamp.
 1913 Irving Langmuir discovers that inert gas could double the luminous efficacy of incandescent lightbulbs.
 1917 Burnie Lee Benbow patents the coiled coil filament.
 1920 Arthur H. Compton invents the sodium-vapor lamp.
 1921 Junichi Miura creates the first incandescent lightbulb to utilize a coiled coil filament.
 1925 Marvin Pipkin invents the first internal frosted lightbulb.
 1926 Edmund Germer patents the modern fluorescent lamp.
 1927 Oleg Losev creates the first LED (light-emitting diode).
 1953 Elmer Fridrich invents the halogen light bulb.
 1953 André Bernanose and several colleagues observe electroluminescence in organic materials.
 1960 Theodore H. Maiman creates the first laser.
 1962 Nick Holonyak Jr. develops the first practical visible-spectrum (red) light-emitting diode.
 1963 Kurt Schmidt invents the first high pressure sodium-vapor lamp.
 1972 M. George Craford invents the first yellow light-emitting diode.
 1972 Herbert Paul Maruska and Jacques Pankove create the first violet light-emitting diode.
 1981 Philips sells their first Compact Fluorescent Energy Saving Lamps, with integrated conventional ballast.
 1981 Thorn Lighting Group exhibits the ceramic discharge metal-halide lamp.
 1985 Osram answers with the first electronic Energy Saving Lamps to be very successful 
 1987 Ching W. Tang and Steven Van Slyke at Eastman Kodak create the first practical organic light-emitting diode (OLED).
 1990 Michael Ury, Charles Wood, and several colleagues develop the sulfur lamp.
 1991 Philips invents a fluorescent lightbulb that lasts 60,000 hours using magnetic induction.
 1994 T5 lamps with cool tip are introduced to become the leading fluorescent lamps with up to 117 lm/W with good color rendering. These and almost all new fluorescent lamps are to be operated on electronic ballasts only.
 1994 The first commercial sulfur lamp is sold by Fusion Lighting.
 1995 Shuji Nakamura at Nichia labs invents the first practical blue and with additional phosphor, white LED, starting an LED boom.

21st century 
 2008 Ushio Lighting demonstrates the first LED filament.
 2011 Philips wins L Prize for LED screw-in lamp equivalent to 60 W incandescent A-lamp for general use.

References

Lighting
Lighting
Types of lamp